The II Corps was a corps-sized formation of the United States Army that was active in both World War I and World War II. It was originally formed and fought on the Western Front during World War I and was also the first American formation of any size to see combat in North Africa or Europe during World War II.

History

World War I 
II Corps was organized on 24 February 1918.
Initially it consisted of the 27th, 30th, 33rd, 78th and 80th Divisions.

In June 1918, the individual divisions of II Corps, which was commanded by Major General George W. Read, were assigned to British and Australian corps for familiarization training. On the 4th of July, when elements of the 33rd Division (Major General George Bell Jr.) took part in the Battle of Hamel, while attached to the Australian Corps. (The Australian commander, General Sir John Monash, was said to have deliberately chosen the date as a gesture and motivator to the American infantry attached to his corps.)  Individual platoons, from four companies of the 131st Infantry and 132nd Infantry, were distributed among Australian battalions, to gain combat experience. This, however, occurred without official approval as there was controversy regarding the battlefield command of US troops by junior officers from other countries. Thus, while Hamel was a relatively minor battle by the standards of World War I, it was historically significant as the first major offensive operation during the war to involve US infantry, the first occasion on which US units fought alongside British Empire forces, and a demonstration that the previously inexperienced American troops could play an effective role in the war. The battle was also historically significant for the use of innovative assault tactics, devised by the Australian general John Monash, were demonstrated. As a result of Pershing's dissatisfaction with the use of US troops the 78th, and 80th Divisions were reassigned and on 23 August 1918 the 33rd Division was moved to the Toul sector. This left just the 27th and 30th Divisions in II US Corps assigned to support the British Expeditionary Force if required. The Divisional artillery brigades of these divisions were also removed and on operations these divisions were supported by Australian or British artillery.

It first saw significant action in Europe in August 1918, in the Hundred Days Offensive, as part of the British Third Army. 
The 33rd Division was in reserve behind the British 4th Army at the opening of the August offensive. With the British III Corps attack stalling on the Chipilly Spur feature the 131st Regiment of the 33rd Division was sent to assist on 9 August, which it did with distinction. The following day the Regiment was attached to the 4th Australian Division and remained there until 12 August. From 12 August until 20 August it was combined with the 13th Australian Brigade in what was called the Liaison Force commanded by Brigadier General E A Wisdom. This was designed to hold the front from the Somme to the Bray-Sur-Somme-Corbie road to relieve the 4th Australian Division from the operation. After this it returned to the 33rd US Division.
Advances made during a secondary assault by the Australian Corps (Battle of Albert) on 21–23 August, were exploited by the Allies in the Second Battle of the Somme. This pushed the German 2nd Army back along a  front line. British and US units advanced on Arras. On 29 August, Bapaume fell to the New Zealand Division and other elements of the British IV Corps. This allowed the Australian Corps to cross the Somme River on 31 August and break the German lines in the Battle of Mont St. Quentin.

During late September 1918, with two Army National Guard Divisions (27th and 30th, less their artillery) under command, II Corps was attached to the Australian Corps as part of British Fourth Army. The Corps was involved in the Battle of St Quentin Canal, during which it suffered heavy losses.
The II Corps HQ took over the front from 6 October 1918 relieving the Australian Corps. It in turn was relieved in the line on 20 October by the IX British Corps.
Its Organisation for this phase was:
27th Division,
30th Division,
301 US Tank Battalion (Mk V tanks)
Attached troops
3 Squadron Australian Flying Corps,
VII Corps RA (British),
VII Corps HA (British),
4th Tank Bde (British),
1st Tank Bn (Mark V Star),
4th Tank Bn (Mark V). 
The 301 US Tank battalion remained in support of the British 1st and 6th Divisions until 25 October.

II Corps was demobilized 1 February 1919.

Interwar years
As part of the National Defense Act of 1920, II Corps was constituted as a unit of the National Guard on 29 Jul 1921. On 15 August 1927 with a subsequent reorganization of the Army, the corps was constituted as a corps in the Regular Army. In preparation for the expansion of the Army, it was activated at Fort Jay, New York as a fully functioning combat unit on 1 August 1940.

World War II
Six months after the Japanese attack on Pearl Harbor and the American entry into World War II, II Corps was sent to England in June 1942, under the command of Major General Mark W. Clark. In November, now under Major General Lloyd Fredendall, II Corps landed in Oran as part of Operation Torch, the Allied invasion of French North Africa. After initially making good headway against German forces during the Tunisia Campaign, II Corps was defeated by German troops under Hans-Jürgen von Arnim at the Battle of Sidi Bou Zid. II Corps was again decisively defeated in February 1943 during the Battle of Kasserine Pass by veteran troops under Generalfeldmarschall Erwin Rommel. The defeats were compounded by American inexperience, poor senior leadership, and lack of armor comparable to that in the German panzer forces, as well as the highly effective German high-velocity 88 mm anti-tank guns, which were used in screening tactics to destroy American tanks lured into pursuit of German armored forces

In March 1943, after a change of command to Major General George Patton, II Corps recovered its cohesion and fought well for the rest of the Tunisia Campaign, winning the Battle of El Guettar. II Corps held the southern flank of the British First Army during the destruction of the remaining Axis forces in North Africa. The war in North Africa ended in May 1943 with almost 250,000 Axis soldiers surrendering, to become prisoners of war.

On 10 July 1943, II Corps, commanded now by Major General Omar Bradley, took part in the amphibious invasion of Sicily (codenamed Operation Husky) under command of the U.S. Seventh Army. It played a key part in the liberation of the western part of the island. The corps consisted of the 1st Infantry Division (United States), 3rd, 9th, and 45th Infantry Divisions. The Allied campaign in Sicily came to an end after 38 days.

Now under Major General Geoffrey Keyes, II Corps was sent to the Italian Front, arriving in mid-November as part of the U.S. Fifth Army, where it was to serve for the rest of the conflict, participating in grueling mountain warfare and often experienced fighting in terrible weather conditions. Soon after arrival, II Corps took the 3rd and 36th Infantry Divisions under command. In late January 1944 II Corps, now with the 1st Armored Division under command, took part in the Battle of Rapido River, part of the first Battle of Monte Cassino, to distract German attention away from the Anzio landings. The operation failed with heavy losses in the 36th Division. During the fourth and final battle of Cassino in May, II Corps consisted of the 85th and 88th Infantry Divisions. For the assault of the German Gothic Line, II Corps consisted of the 34th, 88th and 91st Infantry Divisions. The corps moved up the western side of Italy, and fought in the Spring 1945 offensive in Italy, where it ended up on the right flank of the Fifth Army in May 1945.

II Corps was inactivated in Austria on 10 October 1945, following Germany's surrender.

Cold War 
In March 1958, Camp Kilmer, New Jersey, became Headquarters for the reactivated II Corps as the controlling headquarters for United States Army Reserve units across the northeast. It also assigned personnel to active duty during the Vietnam War when its headquarters was moved to Fort Wadsworth, New York.

Inactivation
The corps was inactivated on 5 June 1970.

Commanders
MG Henry C. Pratt 26 November 1940 – 20 August 1941
MG Mark W. Clark 1 July 1942 – 10 October 1942
MG Lloyd Fredendall 10 October 1942 – 5 March 1943
MG George S. Patton, Jr. 5 March 1943 – 16 April 1943
MG Omar N. Bradley 16 April 1943 – 9 September 1943
MG John P. Lucas 9 September 1943 – 19 September 1943 
MG Geoffrey Keyes 19 September 1943 – 10 October 1945

Notes

References
Gregory Blaxland, Amiens: 1918, London: Frederick Muller, 1968/Star, 1981, .
Center of Military History. To Bizerte with the II Corps, 23 April - 13 May 1943. Washington, D.C.: Center of Military History, U.S. Army, 1990. 
Brig-Gen Sir James E. Edmonds & Lt-Col R. Maxwell-Hyslop, History of the Great War: Military Operations, France and Belgium 1918, Vol V, 26th September–11th November, The Advance to Victory, London: HM Stationery Office, 1947/Imperial War Museum and Battery Press, 1993, .
 Major General Sir Archibald Montgomery, The Story of the Fourth Army in the Battles of the Hundred Days August 8th to November 11th 1918, Hodder and Stoughton, 1919.
John B. Wilson, 'Armies, Corps, Divisions, and Separate Brigades'
Mitchell A. Yockelson, Borrowed Soldiers: Americans under British Command, 1918, Norman, OK: University of Oklahoma Press, 2008, .

1918 establishments in the United States
Military units and formations established in 1918
Military units and formations disestablished in 1970
02
02